The 2015–16 Purdue Boilermakers women's basketball team will represent Purdue University during the 2015–16 NCAA Division I women's basketball season. The Boilermakers, led by tenth year head coach Sharon Versyp, play their home games at Mackey Arena and were a members of the Big Ten Conference. They finished the season 20–12, 10–8 in Big Ten play to finish in sixth place. They advanced to the quarterfinals of the Big Ten women's tournament where they lost to Michigan State. They received an at-large bid of the NCAA women's tournament where they lost to Oklahoma in the first round.

Roster

Schedule

|-
!colspan=9 style="background:#000000; color:white;"| Exhibition

|-
!colspan=9 style="background:#000000; color:white;"| Non-conference regular season

|-
!colspan=9 style="background:#000000; color:white;"| Big Ten regular season

|-
!colspan=9 style="background:#000000; color:white;"| Big Ten Women's Tournament

|-
!colspan=9 style="background:#000000; color:white;"| NCAA Women's Tournament

Source

Rankings
2015–16 NCAA Division I women's basketball rankings

See also
2015–16 Purdue Boilermakers men's basketball team

References

Purdue Boilermakers women's basketball seasons
Purdue
Purdue
2015 in sports in Indiana
2016 in sports in Indiana